The 2022–23 Weber State Wildcats men's basketball team represented Weber State University in the 2022–23 NCAA Division I men's basketball season. The Wildcats, led by first-year head coach Eric Duft, played their home games at the Dee Events Center in Ogden, Utah, as members of the Big Sky Conference.

Previous season
The Wildcats finished the 2021–22 season 21–12, 13–7 in Big Sky play to finish a tie for third place. As the No. 4 seed in the Big Sky tournament, they defeated Montana in the quarterfinals before losing to Northern Colorado in the semifinals. Despite having 21 wins, they were not invited to a postseason tournament.After the season, Rahe would retire as the winningest coach in Weber State and Big Sky conference history.  He would be succeeded by assistant coach Eric Duft.

Offseason

Departures

Incoming transfers

2022 recruiting class

2023 recruiting class

Roster

Schedule and results

|-
!colspan=12 style=| Exhibition

|-
!colspan=12 style=| Non-conference regular season

|-
!colspan=12 style=| Big Sky Conference season

|-
!colspan=9 style=| Big Sky tournament

Source

References

Weber State Wildcats men's basketball seasons
Weber State Wildcats
Weber State Wildcats men's basketball
Weber State Wildcats men's basketball